The Luminaries is a 2020 drama television miniseries written by Eleanor Catton (based on her 2013 novel The Luminaries) and directed by Claire McCarthy. The series is centred on a young adventurer named Anna Wetherell (Eve Hewson), who has travelled from the United Kingdom to start a new life in New Zealand during the 1860s West Coast Gold Rush.

In New Zealand The Luminaries premiered on TVNZ 1 on 17 May 2020 and then had its first broadcast in the UK on BBC One on 21 June 2020. The series has received mixed reviews from critics, though it went on to earn 14 nominations at the 2020 New Zealand Television Awards, winning 8 of them.

Background
Eleanor Catton's novel was awarded the 2013 Man Booker Prize. TVNZ summarises the story as an "epic drama (that) tells the 19th-century tale of love, murder and revenge as men and women travel across the world to make their fortunes on the wild West Coast of New Zealand's South Island." The BBC synopsis added that the series is set "in the boom years of the 1860s gold rush". The script was written by Catton herself and was said to be "very different from the book".

Trailers for the series, providing additional specifics, were released by the BBC on 12 June 2020.

Cast and characters

Main
 Eve Hewson as Anna Wetherell
 Eva Green as Lydia Wells
 Himesh Patel as Emery Staines
 Ewen Leslie as Crosbie Wells
 Marton Csokas as Francis Carver
 Benedict Hardie as Alistair Lauderback
 Erik Thomson as Dick Mannering
 Richard Te Are as Te Rau Tauwhare

Recurring
 Callan Mulvey as George Shepard
 Michael Sheasby as Walter Moody
 Joel Tobeck as Ben Lowenthal
 Paolo Rotondo as Aubert Gascoigne
 Matt Whelan as Cowell Devlin
 Matthew Sunderland as Joseph Pritchard
 Byron Coll as Charlie Frost
 Mark Mitchison as Thomas Balfour
 Yoson An as Sook Yongsheng
 Erroll Shand as Harald Nilssen
 Kirean Charnock as Edgar Clinch
 Gary Young as Quee Long
 Charlie Corrigan as Graves
 Nic Sampson as Sinclair

Episodes and synopsis

Production
British producer Andrew Woodhead optioned the novel for television in 2013, before the book had been shortlisted for the Booker Prize. He saw the potential for a television series in the "rich and vivid world" portrayed in the novel and in its core mystery: "What drives a human being to risk their life on a six-month sea voyage to the other side of the world in the hope of making their fortune on a gold field?" Catton was brought on as the screenwriter for the series, an "unusual if not entirely unheard-of" arrangement. She wrote hundreds of drafts of the pilot episode, but in late 2015 the BBC declined the series; she then shifted the focus to make the protagonist Anna Wetherell, a minor character in the book, and rewrote the series, which was commissioned by the BBC in mid-2016.

In 2019, it was reported that BBC Two was producing a miniseries adaptation, to be directed by McCarthy. The miniseries was produced by Working Title Television and Southern Light Films for BBC Two in association with TVNZ, Fremantle, and Silver Reel, with funding from the New Zealand Film Commission. Catton served as showrunner with director McCarthy during filming.

According to Condé Nast Traveler, the series was filmed at many locations in New Zealand, including the South Island's southeast coast, Hokitika on the West Coast and near Auckland. The Wild West-style main street of Dunedin was set in the car park of a film studio. Other locations included the Tawharanui Peninsula, Te Henga (Bethells Beach) (at and near the water) and a farm where the village of Hokitika and Chinatown were recreated. Because the Arahura River was experiencing flooding, the production shot at Crooked River. The scene of Anna and Emery’s arrival by boat in New Zealand was filmed at Whangaroa; a small set was built on a barge. Catton had insisted on the series being produced on the West Coast, as the flora and fauna there are unique.

Release
The Luminaries premiered on TVNZ 1 on 17 May 2020 and was also available on TVNZ's streaming service TVNZ On Demand. In the United Kingdom, the series was originally intended for distribution by BBC Two but premiered on BBC One on 21 June 2020.

Starz network aired The Luminaries in the United States beginning on 14 February 2021.

Reception
Early reviews in the UK were quite positive. "It is glorious escapism, perfect for our times ... promises to be as addictive as it was in its original form", according to The Guardian. The Times review was neutral but praised the fine performance by Eve Hewson. The review in The Telegraph was less favourable: "It sounds odd to say that a period drama feels dated ... seemed a stuffy throwback" and complained of the overly dark lighting effects. According to BBC News, "many viewers on social media also pointed out the dim lighting, with some saying they had to turn up their brightness while watching".

On review aggregator Rotten Tomatoes, the series holds an approval rating of 65% based on 31 critical reviews, with an average weighting of 6.3/10. The site's critical consensus states: "Lucious , but lacking, The Luminaries has style and character to spare, but those looking for a little more depth may be left wanting."

At the 2020 New Zealand Television Awards, The Luminaries was the most nominated series, with 14 award nominations. It received multiple wins including Best Script (Drama) for Catton, Best Director (Drama) for McCarthy, Best Actor for Himesh Patel, as well as Best Cinematography, Best Production Design, Best Costume Design, Best Makeup Design and Best Post Production Design.

References

External links
 
 
 

2020 New Zealand television series debuts
2020 British television series debuts
2020 New Zealand television series endings
2020 British television series endings
2020s New Zealand television series
2020s British television series
New Zealand drama television series
British drama television series
Television shows based on New Zealand novels
TVNZ 1 original programming
Starz original programming
Television series by Fremantle (company)
Television series by Working Title Television